Peter C. Myers, Sr. (January 4, 1931 – November 26, 2012) was a Missouri politician who served as Deputy Secretary of Agriculture from 1986 to 1989 during the administration of Ronald Reagan. He also served in the Missouri House of Representatives for the 160th district from 1999 to 2007.

Background
Born in Racine, Wisconsin, Myers graduated from William Horlick High School in Racine. Myers then graduated from University of Wisconsin–Madison with a bachelor's degree in agriculture. He then served in the United States Army. Myers died in Sikeston, Missouri.

References

Missouri General Assembly biography

1931 births
2012 deaths
Republican Party members of the Missouri House of Representatives
People from New Madrid County, Missouri
Politicians from Racine, Wisconsin
People from Sikeston, Missouri
University of Wisconsin–Madison College of Agricultural and Life Sciences alumni
United States Deputy Secretaries of Agriculture
William Horlick High School alumni